Tugyl (Tūğyl) is a village in the Tarbagatay District of the East Kazakhstan Region. The administrative center of the Tugyl rural district. It is located approximately 105 km east of the regional center, the village of Aksuat. Before 1992, the village was called Priozyornoe.

The largest enterprise in Kazakhstan for fishing and production of fish products Jaisanbalyq is located in the village.

Population 
In 1999, the population of the village was 7,483 people. According to this census in 2009, 4,744 people lived in the village.

References 

Populated places in East Kazakhstan Region